A Place of My Own: The Education of an Amateur Builder was Michael Pollan's second book, after Second Nature: A Gardener's Education (1991). In 2008 it was re-released and re-titled as A Place of My Own: The Architecture of Daydreams.

The book begins by outlining how Pollan reached the decision to build a "writer's house" himself. The second chapter covers the site selection process. The next chapter follows the design process, including references to Christopher Alexander's A Pattern Language. The following four chapters deal with the construction process. The final chapter covers the finishing work and moving in.

The book is not a how-to book for first-time builders. It is a general overview of the building process, the experiences involved, and the motivations of the author.

External links
Official
A Place of My Own: The Architecture of Daydreams
A Place of My Own, photographs from Michael Pollan website.
Reviews
Mr. Pollan Builds His Dream House, 16 March 1997 book review, New York Times.

1997 non-fiction books
Books by Michael Pollan
Architecture books
Penguin Press books